This is a complete alphabetical list of constituency election results to the 35th Parliament of the United Kingdom at the 1929 general election, held on 30 May 1929.

Notes
Change in % vote and swing is calculated between the winner and second place and their respective performances at the 1924 election. A plus denotes a swing to the winner and a minus against the winner.

England

A to E

F to K

L to P

Q to Z

Wales

Scotland

Northern Ireland

Universities

Notes

References

1929
1929 United Kingdom general election